Motla Kalan is a village in Jatusana Tehsil, Rewari district, Haryana,  India. It belongs to Gurgaon division. Its postal head office is at Dahina.

Villages in Rewari district